

References

List of, Australia
Lists of plants of Australia
Lists of trees